

Online software

Applications

References 

Systems
Systems biology
Data visualization software